Khergarh or Khedgarh may refer to:

 Khed, Rajasthan, a village in Rajasthan, India
 Tilwara, a village in Rajasthan, India

See also 
 Kheragarh, a town in Uttar Pradesh, India